Langavatnet is the name of several lakes in Norway.  

Langavatnet (Aurland), a lake in Aurland municipality, Vestland county
Langavatnet (Eidfjord), a lake in Eidfjord municipality, Vestland county
Langavatnet (Odda), a lake in Ullensvang municipality, Vestland county

See also
Langvatnet